Sart-Eustache Castle is a castle in the village of Sart-Eustache in the municipality of Fosses-la-Ville, province of Namur, Wallonia, Belgium.

See also
List of castles in Belgium

Castles in Belgium
Castles in Namur (province)